The 1979 Taça de Portugal Final was the final match of the 1978–79 Taça de Portugal, the 39th season of the Taça de Portugal, the premier Portuguese football cup competition organized by the Portuguese Football Federation (FPF). The final was played at the Estádio Nacional in Oeiras, and opposed two Primeira Liga sides Boavista and Sporting CP. As the inaugural final match finished 1–1, the final was replayed a day later at the same venue with Os Axadrezados defeating the Leões 1–0 to claim a third Taça de Portugal.

In Portugal, the final was televised live on RTP. As a result of Boavista winning the Taça de Portugal, Os Axadrezados qualified for the 1979 Supertaça Cândido de Oliveira where they took on 1978–79 Primeira Divisão winners Porto.

Match

Details

Replay

Details

References

1979
Taca
Sporting CP matches
Boavista F.C. matches